King Science and Technology Magnet Center is a district-wide magnet school middle school of the Omaha Public Schools system in Omaha, Nebraska, United States.  The school was constructed in 1969 and opened in 1973 in predominantly black North Omaha as Martin Luther King Middle School.  In 1976, the school, under the Omaha Public Schools' Desegregation Plan became a site of forced busing from non-local neighborhoods.

In 1988, the school moved to Florence Boulevard, to the site of the former Horace Mann Middle School, and was reconstituted as King Science Center, a district-wide middle school.  In 2003, technology was added as a magnet theme and the school gained its current name. King Science is a predominantly black school.

Sources
History of: King Science and Technology Magnet Center

External links
Official site

Omaha Public Schools
Magnet schools in Nebraska
Public middle schools in Nebraska